Woodridge School District 68 is a preschool through 8th grade school district headquartered in Woodridge, Illinois.

Schools
 Junior high school
 Thomas Jefferson Junior High School
 Elementary schools
 Edgewood Elementary School
 Goodrich Elementary School
 Meadowview Elementary School
 William F. Murphy Elementary School
 John L. Sipley Elementary School
 Willow Creek Elementary School

References

External links
 

School districts in DuPage County, Illinois
Woodridge, Illinois